Gustavo Cardoso (born 9 January 1982) is a Brazilian handball player for Handebol Clube Taubaté and the Brazilian national team.

References

1982 births
Living people
Brazilian male handball players
Place of birth missing (living people)
Pan American Games medalists in handball
Pan American Games silver medalists for Brazil
Handball players at the 2011 Pan American Games
Medalists at the 2011 Pan American Games
21st-century Brazilian people